Ashley Campbell (born December 8, 1986) is an American musician, singer and songwriter of country music. She is the daughter of Glen Campbell and his fourth wife Kimberly Woollen.

Musical career
Campbell played banjo for her father, Glen Campbell, during his farewell tour in 2011 and 2012. She also appeared in the video for Rascal Flatts' 2012 single "Banjo".

Ashley Campbell released her debut single "Remembering" via Dot Records in 2015. The song previously appeared on the soundtrack of the 2015 documentary Glen Campbell: I'll Be Me, to which she also contributed the track "Home Again". "Remembering" is about her father and his struggles with Alzheimer's disease. The compilation went on to win a Grammy and was nominated for an Oscar. Campbell also released a music video for the song. The song debuted at No. 56 on the Country Airplay chart dated for the week ending December 5, 2015.

In 2016, Campbell was selected as one of the artists to appear at the Country to Country festival in the UK. She performed sets on several of the pop-up stages across the weekend, including a radio session. She is also set to play the main stage at the 2018 festival in a special tribute to her father.  She released her debut album The Lonely One on May 11, 2018. Initially slated to be released on the Dot Records label, Campbell announced that her album would instead be released on her own label, Whistle Stop Records, following the closure of Dot. Produced by Campbell's brother Cal, The Lonely One features 13 tracks all co-written by Campbell.

Personal life
Ashley is the youngest of Glen Campbell's eight children. She is a 2009 graduate of Pepperdine University with a bachelor's degree in Theater. She originally pursued comedy after her graduation and was a member of various improv comedy groups in Los Angeles. Her brother, Shannon, is a member of her band.

Discography

Studio albums

Singles

Music videos

References

External links

1986 births
Living people
American country banjoists
American country singer-songwriters
American women country singers
Dot Records artists
Glen Campbell
Musicians from Phoenix, Arizona
Pepperdine University alumni
21st-century American women singers
21st-century American singers